The Van Beethoven was an international train linking the Dutch capital Amsterdam and the West German capital Bonn. The train was named after the Bonn-born composer Ludwig van Beethoven.

The Van Beethoven was the successor of the TEE Rhein–Main on the same route and schedule. The route of the Rhein–Main was shortened to Amsterdam - Bonn in the autumn of 1971, thus ending the relation with the Main eventually resulting in renaming the TEE to Van Beethoven. Travellers wanting to go to Frankfurt am Main in the evening could proceed from Bonn using the TEE Saphir arriving in Frankfurt eight minutes later than the former Rhein-Main. On request of German members of parliament the route was extended to Nürnberg in 1976, resulting in an arrival around 1:30 a.m. In 1978 the Deutsche Bundesbahn decided to reinstate the Amsterdam Frankfurt service with timed connections to Nürnberg arriving at a decent time (23:58). On 26 May 1979 the Van Beethoven was converted in a two-class InterCity. The Van Beethoven was continued as international service until 1983 and afterwards served several different routes in Germany until the end of 2002.

References

Works cited

International named passenger trains
Named passenger trains of Germany
Named passenger trains of the Netherlands
Trans Europ Express
Railway services introduced in 1973